Eternal Glory is a 1995 demotape released by Italian symphonic power metal band Rhapsody and their first release as Rhapsody.

Early recordings

In October 1994, the band, named Thundercross at that time, had finished recording their first demo Land of Immortals and started sending it to a selection of European labels. By the end of that year, an offer from LMP label came up. 
Land of Immortals track listing

As Rhapsody

In 1995 the band had changed their name to "Rhapsody" and Eternal Glory was released as an official demo containing all the tracks from Land of Immortals plus three newly recorded songs. 
Eternal Glory track listing

Songs
"Invernal Fury", "Warrior of Ice", "Alive and Proud" and "Land of Immortals" were all included in Legendary Tales, with varying changes. 

"Invernal Fury" and "Alive and Proud" were renamed "Rage of the Winter" and "Lord of the Thunder" respectively; "Land of Immortals" had its intro split off into a different track, "Virgin Skies".

"Tears at Nightfall" has never been re-recorded or re-released officially.

"Holy Wind" was included in Symphony of Enchanted Lands, renamed "Riding the Winds of Eternity". "Eternal Glory" was included in the same album, without its 90-second ambient intro.

Personnel
Cristiano Adacher – vocals
Luca Turilli – lead and rhythm guitars
Alex Staropoli – keyboards
Daniele Carbonera – drums
Andrea Furlan – bass guitar
Manuel Staropoli – recorder ("Land of Immortals" and "Holy Wind" only)

References

1995 albums
Demo albums
Rhapsody of Fire albums